Nguyễn Đình Đầu (born March 12, 1920 in Hanoi) is a Vietnamese historian. Đầu's researches include the early history of Saigon. He turned 100 in March 2020.

References

1920 births
Living people
Men centenarians
Vietnamese centenarians
20th-century Vietnamese historians